Endel Kiisa (born 1 October 1937) is an Estonian motorcycle racer.

He was born in Käina, Hiiu County. In 1974 he graduated from Tallinn Pedagogical Institute's Faculty of Physical Education.

He began his motorsport career in 1953, coached by Feliks Lepik. In 1968 he won bronze medal at Imatra Circuit. 1962 he won Soviet Union championships. He is 23-times Estonian champion in different motorcycling disciplines.

Awards:
 2001: best motorcycle racer of 20th century of Estonia
 2020: was chosen to Hall of Fame of Estonian motorsport

References

Living people
1937 births
Estonian motorcycle racers
Soviet motorcycle racers
Tallinn University alumni
People from Hiiumaa Parish